The WAGR ADE class (also known as the Governor class) was a six member class of diesel railcars operated by the Western Australian Government Railways between 1937 and 1962.

History
In December 1937, WG Armstrong, Newcastle upon Tyne delivered the first ADE railcar. It was the first diesel-electric rail vehicle to enter service in Australia. It was followed in 1938 by a further five that were delivered in knocked down form and assembled at the Midland Railway Workshops. All were named after Governors of Western Australia, hence the class name.

It soon became apparent that the railcars had insufficient capacity so five AG carriages were adapted as trailers cars as an interim solution, pending six ADT trailers being delivered by the Midland Railway Workshops in late 1939.

They operated on services from Perth to Merredin via Wyalkatchem, Perth to Merredin via the York-Bruce Rock line, Perth to Katanning, Bunbury to Northcliffe, Busselton and Donnybrook, and Geraldton to Mullewa and Yuna. An additional introduced from Geraldton to Ajana in July 1943.

In 1949/50, they were displaced by the Wildflower class diesel railcars and sent to operate services in more remote parts of the state. Withdrawals commenced in 1957, with the last withdrawn in April 1962. After being stored at Midland Railway Workshops, most were scrapped in 1974.

ADT 9 and ADT 12  survive. ADT 9 was used as an office at the Mary Springs lead mine off the North West Coastal Highway, north of the Murchison River. In 2002, it was sold and moved to a farm in Northampton. On 27 October 2014, it was relocated to the former Northampton railway station. ADT 12 is on a property near Quairading minus its bogies.

References

External links

Armstrong Whitworth locomotives
Diesel multiple units of Western Australia